Okumuşlar is a village located in the Artvin District of Artvin Province, Turkey. Its population is 20 (2021).

References

Villages in Artvin District